Sekou Sanyika (born March 17, 1978 in New Orleans, LA) is a former American football linebacker who played for the Arizona Cardinals of the National Football League.

College
Sekou attended college at the University of California, Berkeley.

Pro
Sanyika was drafted by the Arizona Cardinals in the seventh round of the 2000 NFL Draft.

References

Further reading
 http://cal.rivals.com/content.asp?CID=572648

1978 births
Living people
American football linebackers
Arizona Cardinals players
California Golden Bears football players
Players of American football from New Orleans